Limonium gmelini, the Siberian statice, is a species of flowering plant in the family Plumbaginaceae, native to east-central and southeastern Europe, Russia, the north Caucasus, Turkey, Iran, Kazakhstan, Kyrgyzstan, parts of Siberia, Xinjiang, and Mongolia. A widespread halophytic species, it is found growing in seeps, meadows, steppes, roadsides, and wastelands, as long as they are saline.

The unimproved species is available from commercial suppliers, and there are a number of cultivars, including 'Ste10', and 'Perestrojka'. The Royal Horticultural Society considers this clump-forming perennial's "smoky-blue, long-lasting flowers" to be "very attractive" to pollinators.

References

gmelini
Halophytes
Garden plants
Flora of Czechoslovakia
Flora of Hungary
Flora of Southeastern Europe
Flora of Ukraine
Flora of the Crimean Peninsula
Flora of Central European Russia
Flora of South European Russia
Flora of East European Russia
Flora of the East Aegean Islands
Flora of the North Caucasus
Flora of Turkey
Flora of Iran
Flora of Kazakhstan
Flora of Kyrgyzstan
Flora of Siberia
Flora of Xinjiang
Flora of Mongolia
Plants described in 1891